
Gmina Pierzchnica is a rural gmina (administrative district) in Kielce County, Świętokrzyskie Voivodeship, in south-central Poland.

The gmina contains part of the protected area called Cisów-Orłowiny Landscape Park.

Villages
Gmina Pierzchnica contains the villages and settlements of Brody, Czarna, Drugnia, Drugnia Rządowa, Górki, Gumienice, Holendry, Kalina Górecka, Maleszowa, Osiny, Pierzchnianka, Pierzchnica, Podlesie, Podstoła, Skrzelczyce, Strojnów, Ujny and Wierzbie.

Neighbouring gminas
Gmina Pierzchnica is bordered by the gminas of Chmielnik, Daleszyce, Gnojno, Morawica, Raków and Szydłów.

References
Polish official population figures 2006

Pierzchnica
Kielce County